The Weber State Wildcats women's basketball team is the basketball team representing Weber State University in Ogden, Utah. The program is classified in the NCAA's Division I, and is a member of the Big Sky Conference.

History
Weber State began play in 1974. They played in the Intermountain from 1974 to 1980.  They have won the Big Sky regular season and tournament in 2002 and 2003. The Wildcats lost 51 consecutive Big Sky conference games from March 3, 2011, to February 15, 2014, until they beat Idaho State two days later. In that time, they had two winless conference seasons (including a 0–29 season in 2012–13). They have made the WNIT in 1983 and the WBI in 2016. As of the end of the 2015–16 season, the Wildcats have an all-time record of 535–640.

NCAA tournament results

References

External links